Unnathangalil is a 2001 Indian Malayalam-language action drama film directed by Jomon and written by Robin Thirumala from a story by Jomon. Starring Lal, Manoj K. Jayan and Poornima Indrajith, while Mohanlal makes a cameo appearance. The original songs were composed by Mohan Sithara, while the background score was provided by C. Rajamani.

Plot
Two childhood buddies find themselves going head to head with each other due to their greedy desires.

Cast

 Lal as Shiva
 Manoj K. Jayan as Michael
 Poornima Indrajith as Julie 
 Indraja as Helen	
 Sai Kumar as Antony
 N. F. Varghese as Thankavelu / Velubhayi
 Jagadish as Seban
 Mala Aravindan as Josephettan
 Augustine as panicker	
 Sadiq as Reghu Raman MLA
 Abu Salim as Prabhu
 Geetha Vijayan as Salomi
 Kochaniyan as Michael's Father 
 Bindu Ramakrishnan as Michael's mother
 Mamukkoya as Mammu
 Babu Antony as Thug (Cameo appearance)
 Mohanlal as the saviour (Cameo appearance)

Soundtrack
The original songs were composed by Mohan Sithara, the lyrics were by Gireesh Puthenchery. The background score was provided by C. Rajamani.

Box office 
The film was a box office failure. A non-bailable arrest warrant was issued to director Jomon after he failed to repay the Nilambur Rajeshwari Talkies owner for screening the film.

References

External links

2001 films
2000s Malayalam-language films
Films scored by Mohan Sithara